GiveWell is an American non-profit charity assessment and effective altruism-focused organization. GiveWell focuses primarily on the cost-effectiveness of the organizations that it evaluates, rather than traditional metrics such as the percentage of the organization's budget that is spent on overhead.

History 

In 2006 Holden Karnofsky and Elie Hassenfeld, who worked at a hedge fund in Connecticut, formed an informal group with colleagues to evaluate charities based on data and performance metrics similar to those they used at the fund, and were surprised to find the data often didn't exist. The next year, Karnofsky and Hassenfeld formed GiveWell as a nonprofit to provide financial analyst services to donors. They eventually decided to rate charities based on the metric of how much money it cost to save a life. In the first year, funding to run the nonprofit was provided by a fund called the Clear Fund into which the former members of informal club, now directors of GiveWell, had put around $300,000, with about half of that going to fund the organization.

In the first year, Karnofsky and Hassenfeld advocated that charities should generally spend more money on overhead, so that they could pay for staff and record keeping to track how effective their efforts were; this ran counter to standard ways of evaluating charities based on the ratio of overhead to funds deployed for the charity work itself.

In late 2007, GiveWell's founders promoted the organization on several internet blogs and forums using sockpuppets to ask questions about where to find good information about how to donate and then answering them, recommending GiveWell. GiveWell's board of directors investigated and found that the founders Karnofsky and Hassenfeld had acted inappropriately and as a result, it fined each of them $5000 and Karnofsky was demoted from executive director to a program director.

In 2008, GiveWell received funding from the William and Flora Hewlett Foundation's Nonprofit Marketplace Initiative. The Hewlett Foundation continued to be a major funder of GiveWell until March 2014, when the Hewlett Foundation announced that it was ending the Nonprofit Marketplace Initiative based on a 2010 study it commissioned that found that only 3% of donors selected charities based on performance metrics (rather than e.g. loyalty, personal connections, or faith), and a subsequent 2012 study showing that efforts to provide better data were not changing that pattern.

In 2013, GiveWell moved its offices to San Francisco where people in Silicon Valley had become strong supporters of the effective altruism philosophy.

Givewell's approach is data-driven, and they recommend charities which work in the developing world.

Open Philanthropy 

In 2011, Good Ventures, founded with $8.3 billion by husband and wife Dustin Moskovitz and Cari Tuna, partnered with GiveWell to set up a partner organization called Open Philanthropy, as a vehicle to direct the funding done by Good Ventures. In 2015, Mike Krieger and his fiancee Kaitlyn Trigger pledged $750,000 to Open Philanthropy over two years, with 10% going to fund the operations of the project.

Open Philanthropy has investigated giving money to criminal justice reform and a range of other policy areas, and has funded work into mitigating risks of artificial intelligence, biosecurity, and global health.

In 2017, Open Philanthropy separated from GiveWell, and upon Karnofsky stepping down as Co-Executive Director of GiveWell, Elie Hassenfeld became GiveWell's sole Executive Director.

Recommended charities 
GiveWell makes annual recommendations of the most cost-effective charities. They estimate that they save an average of one life for every US$3,500–5,500 donated. As of August 2022, the top recommended charities are:

 Malaria Consortium (malaria prevention)
 Against Malaria Foundation (malaria prevention)
 Helen Keller International (supplements to prevent vitamin A deficiency)
 New Incentives (conditional cash transfers to encourage vaccination)

See also 
 American Institute of Philanthropy
 Earning to give
 Ethics of philanthropy
 Founders Pledge
 Giving What We Can
 Raising for Effective Giving
 Venture philanthropy

References

Further reading

External links 

 

2011 establishments in the United States
501(c)(3) organizations
American review websites
Charity review websites
Organizations associated with effective altruism
Non-profit organizations based in San Francisco
Organizations established in 2011